Lora Logic (also spelt Laura Logic; born Susan Whitby c. 1960) is a British saxophonist, singer and songwriter from Wembley, London. Logic was a founding member of London punk band X-Ray Spex, and wrote the saxophone parts for their debut album, Germfree Adolescents. After leaving X-Ray Spex, Logic founded her own band, Essential Logic, which released one full-length album in 1979. Logic has been called "one of post-punk's most notable atypical girls."

Career

Logic was briefly a member of the band X-Ray Spex, although she had left that group by the time they recorded their first album, Germfree Adolescents, which nevertheless used her uncredited saxophone arrangements.

A year later, she formed Essential Logic. This group recorded one self-titled EP, four singles, and an album, Beat Rhythm News (Waddle Ya Play?). During the recording of the second Essential Logic album, the group broke up, and Logic finished the recording as a solo album, Pedigree Charm.

Logic was briefly a member of Red Krayola, appearing on two singles and the albums Soldier Talk and Kangaroo?. Her saxophone lent a unique quality to the bands she was in. She also played on recordings by The Raincoats, The Stranglers, Swell Maps, and later, Boy George.

In 1982 she appeared in Laura Mulvey and Peter Wollen's film Crystal Gazing, playing the character Kim; the film was named after a song from Pedigree Charm.

Along with former X-Ray Spex bandmate Poly Styrene, she left the music industry in the early 1980s to join the Hare Krishna religion. Both were taking a lot of drugs and the move turned their lives around. She spent some time in Bhaktivedanta Manor, a mansion donated to the Hare Krishnas by George Harrison. In 1984, she had an arranged marriage at the Krishna temple, and has been married to the same man ever since; they have two children.

In 1995, she rejoined X-Ray Spex when Styrene reformed the group, but it was brief as their egos clashed again. In 2003, the Kill Rock Stars label reissued most of the early Essential Logic material, alongside newer recordings by Logic under the Essential Logic name, as Fanfare in the Garden.

In 2022, a second Essential Logic album, Land of Kali, was released.

References

External links
 2003 interview
 

1960 births
English women singers
Women punk rock singers
Living people
English punk rock singers
Converts to Hinduism
English Hindus
English Hare Krishnas
Red Krayola members
X-Ray Spex members
People educated at the City of London School for Girls
Women in punk